WXHD (98.1 FM) is a radio station broadcasting a contemporary hit radio format. Licensed to Santa Isabel, Puerto Rico, it serves the Puerto Rico area. The station is currently owned by Amor Radio Group Corporation.

External links

XHD
Radio stations established in 2014
2014 establishments in Puerto Rico
Santa Isabel, Puerto Rico